Komedes is the ethnonym of an ancient people in Central Asia. They were mentioned by the ancient Greek geographer Ptolemy in Geography ( CE). Traditional Hindu and Indian spellings included Kumuda, Kumuda-dvipa, and Parama Kambojas; and ancient Greek and Roman spellings included Komedes, Komedei, Traumeda, Caumedae, Homodotes, Homodoti, or Homodontes.

In ancient & medieval texts

Ancient Greece and Rome 
The Greek geographer Ptolemy uses the name Komdei for the region fed by the Jaxartes river (modern Syr Darya) and its tributaries. Ptolemy refers to the people of Komdei as Komedes who "inhabited the entire land of the Sacae." He also refers to a tribal people from the mountaious regions of Sogdiana as far as Jaxartes whom he variously calls Komoi/Kamoi, Komroi/Khomroi or Komedei. Ptolemy's references to the Komdei or Komedes region may allude to the Hindu toponyms Komdesh, Kamdesh, and Kambodesh (or Kamboi-desh). Ammianus Marcellinus also calls the Sogdian region Komadas. Julius Honorius’ Cosmographia mentions a people called Traumeda and a mountain called Caumedes as the source of the river Oxus (modern Amu Darya). Classical sources further indicate that the Komedes living in "Mt Hemodos or Emode" were known as Homodotes.

Hindu texts
Hindu texts from the about 1000 BCE refer to a high tableland north of Himavata (Hindukush or the Himalayas in general) as Kumuda. From here, Indo-Aryan peoples may have pushed their way southwards towards India, preserving the name of their traditions as a relic of old mountain worship. Mahabharata indicates that the Kambojas (specifically the Parama Kambojas, along with the Lohas and Rishikas, lived in the southern parts of Shakdvipa. The Vayu Purana uses the name Kumuda-dvipa as an alternate for Kushadvipa, one of seven dvipa mentioned in Hindu topology. In the Śrīmad-Bhāgavatam (Bhāgavata Purāṇa), Kumuda is a puranic name of a mountain forming the northern buttress of Mount Meru, also known as Sumeru and possibly Pamirs. The Kumuda here extended between the headwaters of what are now the Amu Darya and Syr Darya rivers. It may have comprised Badakshan, the Alay Valley, Alay Mountains, Tienshan, Karotegin (Rasht Valley, in modern Tajikistan) and possibly extended as far north as the Zeravshan and Fergana valleys. On the east, it likely bordered modern Yarkand and/or Kashgar; to the west by Bactria; to the north-west by Sogdiana; to the north by Uttarakuru; to the south-east by Darada; and to the south by Gandhara.

China
The Chinese equivalent to the name may have been Xiuxun. Xuanzang also mentioned the Kiumito and Kumito; Wu'k ong mentioned Kiumiche; and T'ang mentioned Kumi.

Islamic geographers
In Al-Mughni, Al-Maqidisi calls the people inhabiting the Kumed or Kumadh the Kumiji, perhaps equivalent to the Sanskrit word Kamboji or Kambojas. In Iran, the Kambojas region may have been the equivalent to the Komedes.

Modern languages
Linguistic traces of the ancient Kambojas have been suggested in several modern languages of the Pamir Mountains, Khotan and Sogdiana. Languages of this region have shown influence from the Kambojan verb shavti, meaning "to go." For example, modern Pamiri or Ghalchah languages, spoken in and around the Pamir Mountains, also use the word shavti to mean "to go." Wilhelm Tomaschek has stated that, of all the Ghalchah/Pamiri languages, "Munjani is most closely related to the language of Zend Avestan". Michael Witzel connects the ethnolinguistic term Munjan to the Mujavat of the Hindu Atharvaveda and Mahabarata. Other scholars claim Munjan is directed from the root Murg of Amyurgio Sacae, meaning "Soma-twisting Sakas." The Yaghnobi language, spoken in the Yaghnob Valley, also use the verb shavati.

See also
Indo-Scythians

Notes
1. The Kumiji tribesmen of the Buttamn Mountains were in the upper Oxus near Khuttal and were considered a predatory people.
2. Dr V. S. Aggarwala observed: "The name Rishika occurs in Mahabharata as a part of 'Shakadvipa'. Arjuna had conquered Rishikas across the Vakshu (Oxus) which flowed through the Shaka country."  Since the Parama Kambojas, Lohas and the Rishikas were all neighborly tribes and were allied together in their fight against Arjuna. As such, the Transoxian Lohas and Parama Kambojas may have also been located in the Shakadvipa or Scythia.
3. Ashoka's Rock Edicts V and XII at Shahbazgarhi and the Jaina Canon Uttradhyana-Sutra (11/16), both write Kamboya for Kamboja.
4. Robert Shafer reported that the Shakas, Kambojas, Pahlavas, and Sugudas were the left-over population of the Indo-Iranian Aryans after the latter had moved from their original home in Central Asia to Iran and India.
5. Believed to be from the 3rd or 7th century BCE. Shava, the root of the word shavati, was used by the Indo-Aryans.

References

Saka
Nomadic groups in Eurasia
Historiography of Afghanistan
Ancient peoples of India
History of Pakistan
History of Tajikistan